Gustav Dentzel was a German immigrant who built some of the earliest carousels in the United States.

Born in Germany
Gustav Dentzel was born in Kreuznach, Germany, on August 3, 1846. As a child, Gustav, would travel around southwest Germany during the summer from fair to fair with his father, Michael, and the rest of his family, setting up a small, portable carousel ride. Gustav learned the art of woodworking, carving carousel animals and making wagons during the off-season, from his father.

Career
Michael sent Gustav, and his brothers, to the United States, in 1864, along with a carousel, which may have been the first carousel to come to the New World. Gustav first opened a cabinet making shop and hired many German and Italian immigrants, like himself, that had learned woodcarving in the "Old Country". After building a small carousel and touring the countryside with it he found that people were eager to ride it. Gustav founded the Dentzel Carousel Company (also spelled Dentzel Carrousel Company, among other variations) in 1867, in Germantown, Pennsylvania. Dentzel has been credited for introducing the first steam-powered carousel and introducing the use of menagerie animals, such as cats, lions, tigers, deer, in addition to horses and chariots.

Marriage
Gustav married his first wife, Alma, in 1874. Together they had five children, Augusta, William H. I., Margaret, Helen, and Charles. However, Alma died in 1880, and Gustav remarried Mary. They had a son, Edward P.

Death
Gustav died in 1909, his sons William and Edward, took over the company and ran it until 1928, when William died.

References

Bibliography

External links
 

1846 births
1909 deaths
German emigrants to the United States
American woodcarvers
Carousel designers
Amusement ride manufacturers
People from Bad Kreuznach
Burials at Northwood Cemetery, Philadelphia